The 1975–76 Iowa State Cyclones men's basketball team represented Iowa State University during the 1975–76 NCAA Division I men's basketball season. The Cyclones were coached by Ken Trickey, who was in his second season with the Cyclones. They played their home games at Hilton Coliseum in Ames, Iowa.

They finished the season 3–24, 3–11 in Big Eight play to finish in last place. Head Coach Ken Trickey resigned on January 21, 1976.

Roster

Schedule and results 

|-
!colspan=6 style=""|Regular Season

|-

References 

Iowa State Cyclones men's basketball seasons
Iowa State
Iowa State Cyc
Iowa State Cyc